Christian Krypper (died 1573) was a Roman Catholic prelate who served as Auxiliary Bishop of Passau (1570–1573).

On 8 November 1570, Christian Krypper was appointed during the papacy of Pope Pius V as Auxiliary Bishop of Passau and Titular Bishop of Symbalia. He served as Auxiliary Bishop of Passau until his death on 12 Nov 1573.

See also
Catholic Church in Germany

References 

16th-century Roman Catholic bishops in Bavaria
Bishops appointed by Pope Pius V
1573 deaths
Place of birth missing
Year of birth unknown